Benjamin May (born 13 October 1982) is a former New Zealand rugby union player. His position of choice is prop.

Early life
May was born in Blenheim, New Zealand. He attended Nelson College from 1996 to 1999.

Professional career
After three Crusaders appearances, he signed with the Chiefs for the 2008 season, making his Chiefs debut against the Blues. In 2013, May signed with Fukuoka Sanix Blues of the Top League for two years, beginning with the 2013–14 season.

May also has played in the ITM Cup for Nelson Bays, Tasman and Waikato, making his debut with the former in 2004. Currently, May plays for Hawke's Bay in the Mitre 10 Cup.

Of Ngāti Maniapoto descent, May played for the Māori All Blacks in 2007, 2008 and 2012.

References

External links
Hurricanes profile
Waikato profile
itsrugby.co.uk profile

1982 births
Living people
New Zealand rugby union players
Māori All Blacks players
Ngāti Maniapoto people
Hurricanes (rugby union) players
Chiefs (rugby union) players
Crusaders (rugby union) players
Rugby union props
Rugby union players from Blenheim, New Zealand
People educated at Nelson College
Tasman rugby union players
Waikato rugby union players
New Zealand expatriate sportspeople in Japan
Expatriate rugby union players in Japan
New Zealand expatriate rugby union players
Munakata Sanix Blues players
Nelson Bays rugby union players
Wellington rugby union players
Hawke's Bay rugby union players
Taranaki rugby union players